The Lebanese Armed Forces (LAF) ((FAL)), also known as the Lebanese Army, is the military of the Lebanese Republic. It consists of three branches, the ground forces, the air force, and the navy. The motto of the Lebanese Armed Forces is "Honor, Sacrifice, Loyalty" (Arabic: "شرف · تضحية  · وفاء" - Sharaf.Tadhia.Wafa').

Emblem 
The Lebanese Armed Forces symbol consists of a Lebanon cedar tree surrounded by two laurel leaves, positioned above the symbols of the three branches: the ground forces represented by the two bayonets, the navy represented by an anchor, and the air force represented by two wings.

General overview
The Lebanese Armed Forces' primary missions include defending Lebanon and its citizens against external aggression, maintaining internal stability and security, confronting threats against the country's vital interests, engaging in social development activities and undertaking relief operations in coordination with public and humanitarian institutions.

The armed forces consist of 84,200 active personnel with the ground force consisting of approximately 80,000 troops, the air force 2,500 personnel and 1,700 in the naval force. The remaining personnel are commanders, advisors, engineers and members of the special forces. The LAF is an all-volunteer force. All three branches are operated and coordinated by the LAF Commander; a position customarily held by a Maronite Catholic Christian, from the ministry of defence which is located in Yarzeh, east of Lebanon's capital, Beirut. The current commander in chief of the Lebanese Armed Forces is General Joseph Aoun. Currently, the LAF is ranked sixth in the world in terms of growth, with the number of military personnel doubling over the period between 1985 and 2000. The country has six military colleges and schools. Lebanese officers are sent to other countries such as the United States, Russia or other parts of Europe to receive additional training.

The equipment of the LAF is outdated due to lack of funds, political bickering and until the 2000s, the presence of foreign forces. The Lebanese government is working with its partners to improve the armed forces' capabilities. After the conclusion of the Lebanese Civil War, the LAF decided to repair as much of its equipment as it could, while being aided by modest donations from other states. The United States remains a key partner for Lebanon in this improvement process. About 85% of the LAF's equipment is US-made, with the remaining being UK, French, and Soviet-made.

History

During the period of semi-autonomous province of Mount Lebanon Mutasarrifate between 1861 and 1914, the province reportedly had its own army of volunteer militias which gained the attention of a traveler in 1914, contending: "the free independent bearing of these mountaineers was in striking contrast to that of the underpaid, underfed and poorly clothed conscripts of the regular [Turkish] army".

The beginnings of the modern Lebanese Army arose during 1916, when the French government established the "Legion of the Orient", which included Lebanese soldiers. After a post World War I League of Nations mandate was established over Lebanon in April 1920, France formed the Army of the Levant, which was later reorganized to include the locally recruited Troupes Spéciales du Levant (Special Troops of the Levant). These indigenous troops were diverse units composed of Lebanese, Syrian, Circassian and Kurdish enlisted personnel; all commanded predominantly by French officers. By 1938, the Troupes Speciales numbered 10,000 with 306 officers, of whom only 88 were French. In addition to the locally engaged Troupes Speciales; North African, Senegalese and French military units served in Syria and the Lebanon.

Later in 1926, the Lebanese First Sharp Shooters Unit was created out of the Special Troops of the Levant; it is considered to be a direct precursor to the Lebanese Armed Forces (LAF).

During World War II, Lebanese troops fought in Lebanon with the Vichy French forces against Free French and British forces. After the Vichy forces in the Middle East surrendered in July 1941, volunteers from the Troupes Spéciales du Levant enlisted in the Free French forces and participated in combat in Italy, North Africa, and southern France. In 1943, prior to the declaration of Lebanese independence, all the military units were combined in one brigade, the Fifth Brigade, under the command of General Fouad Chehab. On the day Lebanon declared independence, the Lebanese Third Sharp Shooters (tirailleurs) Regiment was placed at the disposal of the Lebanese government in order to maintain security. In June of the same year, the French reconstituted units of the Troupes Spéciales du Levant, which were then attached to the British forces in the Middle East. The majority of the Lebanese Armed Forces remained a part of the French Army in Lebanon.

Post-Independence

After Lebanon gained independence in 1943, the Lebanese government formed an official delegation in 1944 to negotiate with the French the terms related to handing over the LAF. After nearly three weeks of talks, the joint French-British Command decreed that responsibility for armed units under French control were to be handed over to the Independent Government of Lebanon. These units were part of the Troupes Spéciales du Levant and totaled about 3,000 men. On August 1, 1945, at 00:00 hours, the LAF was placed under full authority of the Lebanese National Government; this day is commemorated annually as Lebanese Army Day.

After establishing authority over the LAF in 1945, the Lebanese government intentionally kept its armed forces small and weak due to the country's unique internal politics. Christian politicians feared that Muslims might use the armed forces as a vehicle for seizing power in a military coup. They also appeared unwilling to incur the cost of maintaining a large well equipped army. Throughout the 1950s and 1960s, Lebanon never spent more than 4% of its GNP on the military budget. Many Christian Lebanese also feared that a large army would inevitably force Lebanon into the Arab–Israeli conflict. However, Muslim politicians were also worried that a strong army could be used against Muslim interests because it would be commanded by Christians. At the same time they tended to feel that the military should be strong enough to play a part in the Arab-Israeli struggle. In addition to the two major conflicting views, prominent Lebanese politicians of the myriad of religious denominations in Lebanon have also tended to be feudal warlords commanding their own private militias and feared that a strong army would endanger their personal power.

On 6 June 1948, the 3rd battalion of the Lebanese Army, backed by Arab Liberation Army, fought Israeli forces occupying the Lebanese villages of Qadas and Malkieh and captured them, subsequently handing them over to the ALA and withdrawing by 8 July. This was the first major combat operation for the Lebanese Armed Forces under the Independent Lebanese Government.

Branches

Armed Forces Command
The LAF Command is headquartered at Yarzeh. The organizational structure of the LAF Command includes:
 The Commander-in-Chief
 The Chief of staff
 Deputy Chiefs of Staff
 Various Directorates

Lebanese Ground Forces
The Lebanese Ground Forces are by far the largest of the three branches of the military.

The Lebanese Ground Forces consist of:
 5 Regional Commands
 Beirut Region
 Bekaa Region
 Mount Lebanon Region
 North Region
 South Region
 11 Brigades
 5 Heavy (Mechanised) Brigades
 1st Infantry Brigade
 2nd Infantry Brigade
 3rd Infantry Brigade
 5th Infantry Brigade
 6th Infantry Brigade
 6 Light Brigades
 7th Infantry Brigade
 8th Infantry Brigade
 9th Infantry Brigade
 10th Infantry Brigade
 11th Infantry Brigade
 12th Infantry Brigade
 1st Artillery Regiment
 2nd Artillery Regiment
 Signals Regiment 
 Lebanese Commando Regiment
 Includes the Mountain Combat Company.
 Lebanese Airborne Regiment
 Counter-Sabotage Regiment (Moukafaha)
 1st Intervention Force Regiment
 2nd Intervention Force Regiment
 3rd Intervention Force Regiment
 4th Intervention Force Regiment
 5th Intervention Force Regiment
 6th Intervention Force Regiment
 Republican Guard Brigade
 Medical Brigade
 Support Brigade
 Logistics Brigade
 Military Police
 Army Band
 Independent Construction Regiment
 1st Armored Regiment
 1st Land Border Regiment
 2nd Land Border Regiment
 3rd Land Border Regiment
 4th Land Border Regiment
The Fourth Brigade was previously active but was disbanded in 1984

Lebanese Air Force

The Lebanese Air Force currently has a number of helicopters including the Bell UH-1H Huey, Aérospatiale SA 330 Puma, Gazelle, Cessna Caravan, Hawker Hunters, and various others. The air force is currently in the process of restoring its jet capabilities and considering the purchase of a small number of fighters or jet trainers.

Lebanese Naval Forces

The Lebanese Navy, officially the Lebanese Naval Forces is responsible for protecting Lebanon's territorial waters, ports, and fighting illegal smuggling of goods. At the head of the naval hierarchy is the Navy Command, then it branches off into the quarter-general of the Navy, the Department of Naval Equipment Stores, the Naval School, Beirut Naval Base and the Jounieh Naval Base.

The navy, which currently lacks a suitable amount of equipment, has approximately 50 vessels of various sizes and roles; however, it is trying to modernize itself and increase its size.

Lebanese Special Forces

The Lebanese Special Forces are the elite of the Lebanese Armed Forces. Those who enroll are subjected to rigorous training regimes and must be in peak physical and mental condition prior to their ascension to such a highly desired position. Each branch of the Armed Forces maintains its own form of Special Forces or Commandos. These include:
 Commando Regiment (Also known as the Maghaweer)
 Lebanese Airborne Regiment - Moujawkal
 Marine Commandos
 Lebanese counter-terrorism and sabotage unit (Moukafaha)
 Panthers (part of the Internal Security Force, i.e. police)

To ensure the effectiveness of such an elite force, many Commandos are sent overseas to nations such as the US, UK and France to receive extra training in specialized areas that the Lebanese Armed Forces are unable to provide, due to a lack of resources. While training in Lebanon, each Commando is instructed in the art of urban and guerrilla warfare. So rigorous is their domestic training regime that each commando is subjected to a training timetable consisting of 20 hours per day for 3 months, which is divided into different stages. Each stage consists of a specialized form of warfare and its associated tactics. Such tactics include: sabotage, sniping, extraction and covert operations. The Lebanese Special Forces are also well known for killing and eating snakes with their bare hands at graduation ceremonies.

In 2008, the Lebanese Armed Forces started establishing the Lebanese Special Operations Command in order to group the LAF's elite units. These special operations forces will include the Airborne Regiment, the Rangers Regiment, the Navy Commandos Regiment, and the Counter-Sabotage Regiment of the Military Intelligence. The initial size of the force will be less than two brigades, around 5,000 troops, but the plan is to enlarge it up to three brigades.

Colleges and Schools
The Lebanese Armed Forces has six official military colleges and schools that serve a wide variety of functions from officer training to overseeing national youth conscription programs. The recent emphasis on the First Flag Service Center is designed to help overcome the diverse nature of the population. The schools and colleges are:
 Fouad Shehab Command and Staff College
 High Center for Military Sport
 Lebanese Army Military Academy
 Skiing and Mountain Fighting School
 Teaching Institute
 Air Force Aviation School
 Naval Academy
 Lebanese Special Forces School

The Staff and Command College, Military Academy, and Mountain Skiing Fighting School are training centers for Lebanese soldiers designed to upgrade the quality of their skills while the High Center for Military Sport is designed to keep them in peak physical shape (it also organizes sports groups and teams for international competition as well). The Training Institute is designed to help soldiers specialize in certain aspects of the military, such as artillery and defense.

Equipment

The Lebanese Army still uses equipment mostly received through donations or friendly prices. Its work horse is the M113 which is commonly used by every regiment and brigade. A collection of Western and Soviet made weaponry and equipment exists ranging from rifles to tanks. However, the Lebanese Army is trying to re-arm and modernize itself through new aid and purchases from different countries such as the United States, Belgium, Russia, and The Netherlands. A list of awaiting-for-delivery armaments is constantly growing and includes M60 Patton tanks, M198 Howitzers, etc. A recent Russian promise to supply Lebanon with T-90 tanks has been in discussion since the Lebanese Defense Minister's last visit to Russia on December 16, 2008.

Throughout history the Lebanese Army employed different weapons and equipment which, at the time, were considered state of the art. Most of these arms have either been phased out of service or sold to other countries. Among the major equipment that is not currently active are AMX-13, Saladin, Panhard M3, and Staghound vehicles.

Military ranks

The military ranks are as follows:

Uniforms

Training
Training of new conscripts takes place in the First Flag Service Center (FFSC). After a week of enlisting, they submit to two training courses, the common military training basic course and the specific course. All these courses are organized in details according to a program determining hours of training taking into consideration the conscript rank. The first course consists of 240 hours equivalent to 9 weeks and the training program is composed of:
 Military rules and regulations
 Technical and tactical education
 Weapons
 Physical fitness
 Orientation and moral preparation

The second course consists of 84 hours equivalent to three weeks. The infantry course is composed of:
 Physical fitness
 Drill
 Infantry weapons, which are available in the Lebanese army and its tactics.

Combat History

1975–1990 Lebanese Civil War

As the civil war escalated, Lebanese militias grew stronger and soon surpassed the regular army. This rapidly undermined the authority of the central government. The government's ability to maintain order was also handicapped by the nature of the Lebanese Army. One of the smallest in the Middle East, it was composed based on a fixed ratio of religions. As members defected to sectarian militias, the army would eventually prove unable to contain the militant groups, rein in the PLO or monitor foreign infiltration. Since the government was Christian-dominated, especially the officers' ranks, trust among Muslims for central institutions, including the army, was low. The disintegration of the Lebanese Army was eventually initiated by Muslim deserters declaring that they would no longer take orders from the Maronite generals.

Taif Agreement 1991
On 4 July 1991, following the failure of disarmament negotiations, as required by the Taif agreement, the Lebanese Army attacked Palestinian positions in Southern Lebanon. The offensive, involving 10,000 troops against an estimated 5,000 militia, lasted 3 days and ended with the Army taking all the Palestinian positions around Sidon. In the agreement that followed all heavy weapons were surrendered and infantry weapons only allowed in the two refugee camps, Ain al-Hilweh and Mieh Mieh. 73 people were killed in the fighting, and 200 wounded, mostly Palestinian.

1999–2000 Dinnieh fighting

During December 1999–January 2000 an Islamic group launched a failed uprising against the Lebanese authorities in the Dinnieh district. In a period of 8 days of fighting in the snow-blanketed mountains east of the northern port of Tripoli, 14 soldiers and 25 rebels were killed.

2006 War

In the 2006 Lebanon War the LAF did not engage in a direct conflict with the Israeli Army, despite its threat of retaliation if the IDF pushed too far northward into Lebanon. However, Israel did bomb several Lebanese military bases. While providing aid to civilians, Lebanese troops helped to uphold order in city streets, directed refugees to safer areas, and assisted with overlooking damage done by Israeli attacks. On several occasions, Lebanese troops fired anti-air weapons at Israeli aircraft, but no damage was documented. Overall, 49 Lebanese soldiers were killed.

After the 2006 Lebanon War the LAF deployed south of the Litani River for the first time since 1968 to enforce Security Council Resolution 1701. The LAF says it will not, and cannot, disarm Hezbollah by force. On August 3, 2010, the Lebanese army fired at Israeli soldiers whom crane lifted a soldier across the border, to remove a tree off the fence; Israeli troops returned fire. 3 LAF soldiers, one Israeli officer and 1 Lebanese journalist were killed in the incident (After Israeli Artillery & aircraft bombing). According to UN reports, the border fence in the area is actually inside Israel's international border. The UNIFIL force stationed in the south described the shootout as a "serious incident".

2007 North Lebanon conflict

The 2007 Lebanon conflict began when fighting broke out between Fatah al-Islam, an Islamic terrorist organization, and the Lebanese Armed Forces on May 20, 2007, in Nahr al-Bared, a Palestinian refugee camp near Tripoli. It has been the most severe internal fighting since Lebanon's 1975–90 civil war. The primary theater of conflict was the Siege of Nahr el-Bared. There was heavy use of the Lebanese artillery in that area to eliminate snipers posted around the cities. The conflict finally ended on September 2, 2007, with the Lebanese Army taking control of the camp after more than three months of heavy fights and a death toll of 155 Commandos and Infantrymen. The LAF Engineering Corps achieved what was seen as a feat of ingenuity during the conflict where they converted a number of UH-1 helicopters into bombers, arming them with 250 kg and 400 kg conventional bombs from old Hunter and Mirage III fighter jets. Some helicopters were also fitted with French Matra rocket pods. This was, according to observers, a decisive step that considerably shortened the conflict.

2008 Clashes in Lebanon

During the week-long clashes that occurred at the beginning of May 2008 in Beirut and other regions of the country, the army was unable to prevent rival Lebanese groups from fighting each other. This was because the army, along with the government, had thought it would have been better if rival groups would eventually end the violence and sort out the dispute between them, alone, other than involving the national army which may have led to great divisions between the soldiers, just like in the civil war. It would have also caused an out cry to the soldiers that could have died, leading to even greater divisions and blame to the political forces. However, whenever ceasefire was brought into action in a specific area or district in Beirut or elsewhere in the country, the LAF would straight away enforce peace. On May 13, the national army had announced that if the clashes would not end as soon as possible, it would have to intervene and use force if necessary to stop them.

2011–2017 Syrian Civil War spillover in Lebanon

Since the outbreak of conflict in Syria, the Lebanese Army has been deployed to prevent clashes from taking place in the city of Tripoli, as well as in other hot zones such as Beirut and Arsal on the eastern borders. In 2014, ISIS and Al-Nusra Front terrorist groups established small bases and fortifications in the Anti-Lebanon Mountains, where they operated against Hezbollah and the Lebanese Army.

On June 23, 2013, intense clashes in Sidon took place between followers of Salafist Sunni preacher Ahmad Al-Assir and Lebanese troops. Following these clashes, the Lebanese Army was sent in to capture Sheikh Assir's headquarters at Abra and apprehend him. Lebanese Army units fought against pro-Assir militants for two days in a battle that led to the deaths of at least 16 Lebanese soldiers, and the wounding of at least 50 men. Although the LAF managed to secure his complex, Assir was able to escape and was only captured on August 16, 2015, while trying to flee the country on a false passport.

On August 2, 2014, following the arrest of an Al-Nusra Front Commander Abu Ahmad Jumaa; Terrorists from Al-Nusra and ISIS launched an assault on the Lebanese Armed Forces in the town of Arsal and seized control of the town. By August 7, a fragile truce was established as ISIS and Al Nusra forces also retreated from the town and redeployed along the border with Syria. Their hideouts there were subsequently bombed by the Syrian Air Force. Two days later, the Lebanese Army entered Arsal in full force and re-established control over checkpoints that the militants had previously seized.

On July 21, 2017, Hezbollah, Syrian Armed Forces and the Lebanese Army launched a military operation against ISIS and Tahrir al-Sham positions on the Lebanon–Syria border. The Lebanese army committed the 5th Infantry Brigade and 7th Infantry Brigade to the battle, and heavily shelled ISIS and HTS positions. By August 28, most of the ~2,100 militants surrendered to Hezbollah and the Syrian Army.

See also
 Internal Security Forces
 General Security Directorate (Lebanon)
 Rangers of the Lebanese Army Sports Event
 Tomb of the Unknown Soldier (Lebanon)
 United Nations Interim Force in Lebanon

References

External links

 Lebanese Armed Forces (LAF) Official Website
 Lebanon Military Guide from GlobalSecurity.org
 CIA - The World Factbook - Lebanon
 Army Recognition Index of Lebanese Military Equipment
 Global Fire Power - Lebanon Military Strength
 Lebanon army trying to rearm and modernize itself
 Lebanese Military Wish List 2008/2009 - New York Times
 Lebanese army Twitter account